Eastern United FC is a football (soccer) club based in Adelaide, South Australia. The club was established in 2013 by some concerned supporters and life members of the previous club. They play their home games at Athelstone Recreation Reserve in the Adelaide suburb of Athelstone.

History
In 2012 the club was set up with the intention to enter the FFSA State League in 2013, after the collapse of N.A.B. SC the club was granted permission to replace N.A.B. and participate in the FFSA State League. After discussions and consultation with Diego Pellegrini and his father Giuseppe Pellerini, and their acceptance to become involved and take the club to the next level. It was agreed in 2021 the club would not focus on junior development and provide an alternative pathway to juniors who were serious about playing soccer, and looking beyond the boundaries of South Australia to ply their passion in a more professional environment. It is no longer hopeful that this will lead those players to a professional league in Asia, Europe or South America. On 10 May 2012 the club announced they would be conducting trials to fill squads for the 2013 season.
The club after several years in State League 2, was able to gain promotion in State League 1 during the 2020 season.

Current squad

External links
 Club Home Page
 Facebook

References

Soccer clubs in Adelaide
Association football clubs established in 2012
2012 establishments in Australia